Nikita Oleksandrovych Kukanov (born 8 September 2002) is a Ukrainian professional footballer who plays as a left midfielder for Ukrainian club Kramatorsk.

References

External links
 
 

2002 births
Living people
Footballers from Luhansk
Ukrainian footballers
Association football midfielders
FC Kramatorsk players
Ukrainian First League players